Heinrich Mehringer (born 23 February 1952) is a German biathlete. He competed in the 20 km individual event at the 1976 Winter Olympics.

References

External links
 

1952 births
Living people
German male biathletes
Olympic biathletes of West Germany
Biathletes at the 1976 Winter Olympics
People from Miesbach (district)
Sportspeople from Upper Bavaria